Pakistan was represented at the 2006 Commonwealth Games in Melbourne by a 75-member strong contingent comprising 53 sportsmen and women, 21 officials and 1 head of the contingent.

The Pakistan team's dismal performance in the 2006 Commonwealth Games (only 5 medals, including 1 gold) drew public criticism, in view of the large contingent sent to the Games.  The official-to-sportsperson ratio was among the highest of any participating team, and newspaper editorials in Pakistan have asked for accountability in expenditure of public funds.

Medals

Gold
 Shuja-Ud-Din Malik, Weightlifting, Men's 85 kg

Silver
 Lassi Mehrullah, Boxing,  Featherweight 57 kg
 Irshad Ali, Shooting, Men's 25m Standard Pistol
 Hockey, Men's Team

Bronze
 Muhammad Irfan, Weightlifting, Men's 77 kg and he is from lahore

Pakistan's team at the 2006 Commonwealth Games

Field hockey

Men's team
 Salman Akbar
 Imram Warsi
 Muhammad Saqlain
 Dilawar Hussain
 Adnan Maqsood
 Tariq Aziz
 Rehan Butt
 Muhammad Shabbir
 Nasir Ahmed
 Mudassar Ali Khan
 Shakeel Abbasi
 Imran Khan Yousafzai
 Muhammad Zakir
 Muhammad Imran
 Zeeshan Ashraf
 Muhammad Zubair
Head coach: Asif Bajwa

References

Pakistan at the Commonwealth Games
Nations at the 2006 Commonwealth Games
Commonwealth Games